Zohur Ahmed Chowdhury Stadium (Zahur Ahmed Chowdhury Stadium), abbreviated as ZAC Stadium or ZACS and previously known as Bir Shrestha Shahid Ruhul Amin Stadium, is a cricket stadium located in the port city of Chattogram, in south-eastern Bangladesh. It became a Test cricket venue on 27 February 2006 when it hosted a Test match between Sri Lanka and Bangladesh. It hosted two group matches of the 2011 ICC Cricket World Cup. It has a seating capacity of around 20,000. The stadium was initially named after Zahur Ahmad Chowdhury on 17 June 2001 by the Bangladesh Awami League government. It was renamed after Ruhul Amin by the Bangladesh Nationalist Party government in October 2001. It was returned to its original name in 2009 of Zahur Ahmed Chowdhury Stadium after Bangladesh Awami League returned to power.

Currently, it is the main cricket venue of the port city. Previously, the M. A. Aziz Stadium was the main cricket venue of Chittagong; however, it focuses on football now.  It is also home to the Chittagong Vikings, the local franchise in the Bangladesh Premier League.

History
Situated about half-an-hour's drive outside the city centre, the Chittagong Divisional Stadium was one of the five purpose-built cricket grounds established in the run-up to the 2004 Under-19 World Cup. It was finally granted full international status in January 2006, ahead of Sri Lanka's tour to the country. The stadium itself is a concrete bowl set in acres of prime agricultural land, with a three-tier pavilion providing the focal point. The stadium provides views of beautiful lush trees, the port, and ships on the coast. It had floodlights installed prior to the world cup, only the fourth cricket ground in Bangladesh, giving the ability to host day/night cricket matches.

The venue has also hosted group stage matches of 2004 and 2016 Under-19 Cricket World Cup matches.

In February 2021, in the  first test between Bangladesh and West Indies, West Indies won the match by 3 wickets chasing 395 runs, courtesy of debutant Kyle Mayers's 210*, which was  fifth-highest successful run chase in test cricket and highest successful run chase on Asian soil, while Mayers became the first batsman to score a double century in the fourth innings of a test on debut and overall sixth batsman to score a double hundred in the fourth innings.

Stats and records

Stats

Records
 In 2013 Mominul Haque made his highest individual score against New Zealand in this venue, he scored 181, which is 5th highest by any Bangladeshi batsmen in Test cricket.
 In the same Test Sohag Gazi became the world's only cricketer to take a hat-trick and hit a century in same tmTest. He scored 101* and a six wicket-haul with a hat-trick.
 In the ICC Cricket World Cup 2011 Bangladesh first time defeated England in World Cup history.
 Winning the 3rd ODI on 15 July 2015, Bangladesh first time won a series against South Africa. In this match South Africa scored their lowest total (168/9) in ODI without being all out. This is also 2nd lowest total for South Africa against Bangladesh. This series win was 4th successive series win for Bangladesh since November 2014.
 On 4 January 2018, in the first test between Bangladesh and Sri Lanka Mominul Haque scored centuries in both innings, becoming the first Bangladeshi batsman to do so and overall 67th batsman in Test cricket. He scored 176 and 105 runs in two innings and with that he holds the record of most runs in a test (281 runs) by a Bangladeshi batsman surpassing previous record of Tamim Iqbal who scored a total of 231 runs against Pakistan in Khulna in 2012.
 On 31 January Mominul Haque became 66th batsman to score  centuries in both innings of a test. He achieved this feat  against Sri Lanka scoring 176 & 105 in two innings. 
 On 22 November 2018, scoring a century (120)  against West Indies, Mominul Haque came to the no. 5 position in the list of scoring most centuries (6) in Tests at any single ground. 
 Against West Indies in 2018 by picking up the wicket of Kieran Powell, Shakib Al Hasan became first Bangladeshi player to pick up 200 Test wickets and in this process he also became the fastest cricketer, in terms of matches, to score 3,000 runs and take 200 wickets in Tests (54 matches).

2011 ICC Cricket World Cup

It was the second venue in Bangladesh of the 2011 ICC Cricket World Cup, the other being Sher-e-Bangla Cricket Stadium in Dhaka. It hosted two matches, the historic match between Bangladesh and England, where the home team nail-bitingly beat England, and the other being between the home side and Netherlands.

See also
 List of Test cricket grounds
 List of international cricket grounds in Bangladesh
 Stadiums in Bangladesh

References

External links

Sport in Bangladesh
Cricket grounds in Bangladesh
Test cricket grounds in Bangladesh
Sport in Chittagong
2011 Cricket World Cup stadiums